Jonjaamji is a Korean Buddhist site of a pagoda preserving the sacred relics of Lord Buddha. Jonjaamji is located in a valley on the southwest ridge of Bulrae Oreum at the Yeongsil Track region of Hallasan on Jeju Island, South Korea. On November 1, 2000, the Jeju Provincial Government designated Jonjaamji as Tangible Property Number 17.

History
It is unknown when exactly the Jonjaam temple was founded, but two excavations in 1993 and 1994 suggest that it was constructed by Jonja, the great monk of Arhan, during the Late Goryeo Dynasty through the Middle Joseon Dynasty period.

Chungam Kim Jeong, who was exiled to Jeju-do in August 1520, wrote a book called "Jonjaam Jungsugi."  According to his writings, Jonjaam was created when three families, Go, Yang and Bu (the demi-gods from the Samseonghyeol legend) settled in Jeju-do.

See also
Korean Buddhist temples
Korean Buddhism

References

External links
 Tour2Jeju Jonjaamji
 Brief Information about Jonjaamji at Encyber encyclopedia
 General Information about Jonjaamji at Jeju Special Self-Governing Province 제주도청

Buildings and structures in Jeju Province
Buddhist temples in South Korea